Poems by Currer, Ellis, and Acton Bell was a volume of poetry published jointly by the three Brontë sisters, Charlotte, Emily and Anne in 1846 (see 1846 in poetry), and their first work in print. To evade contemporary prejudice against female writers, the Brontë sisters adopted masculine first names. All three retained the first letter of their first names: Charlotte became Currer Bell, Anne became Acton Bell, and Emily became Ellis Bell. The book was printed by Aylott and Jones, from London. The first edition failed to attract interest, with only two copies being sold. However, the sisters decided to continue writing for publication and began work on their first novels, which became commercial successes.

Following the success of Charlotte's Jane Eyre in 1848, and after the deaths of Emily and Anne, the second edition of this book (printed in 1850 by Smith & Elder) fared much better, with Charlotte's additions of previously unpublished poetry by her two late sisters. It is believed that there are fewer than ten copies in existence with the Aylott and Jones title-page.

See also
List of Brontë poems

External links

Poems by Currer, Ellis, and Acton Bell by Charlotte Brontë, Emily Brontë and Anne Brontë. London: Aylott and Jones, 1846 at A Celebration of Women Writers

 

1846 books
English poetry
Brontë poems
Victorian poetry
Works published under a pseudonym